'Madhukali' is a Hindustani classical raga.

Theory

Arohana and Avarohana
Arohana: Sa komalGa teevraMa Pa Ni Sa

Avarohana: S2 Ni komal Dha Pa, teevra Ma Pa komal Dha komal Ni komal Dha Pa, teevraMa komal Ga Re Sa

Vadi and Samavadi
Sa Sonant

Pa Consonant

Pakad or Chalan
This Raga is Pentatonic while ascending and Heptatonic in descending.

Organization & Relationships
Madhukali is a Raga created by Dr. Lalmani Misra, who played Vichitra Veena,  on basis of classical principles of consonance (The Raga Guide: A Survey of 74 Hindustani Ragas, 1999). It blends Madhuvanti, Multani and Ramkali (Raga Rupanjali, 2007 p. 304).

Thaat: It belongs to the category of Raga-s that can be classified under any thaat.

Behavior
This Raga makes use of all seven notes. However, while ascending, the second and the sixth notes are skipped. It comprises third and sixth flat with sharp fourth. The seventh note is both, natural and flat. A special use of this seventh is indicative of Ramkali.

Samay (Time)
Evening.

Seasonality
Madhukali has no seasonal associations.

Rasa
Karun (Pathos)

Historical Information
Created in late sixties.

Important Recordings

References
Bor, Joep (ed). Rao, Suvarnalata; der Meer, Wim van; Harvey, Jane (co-authors) The Raga Guide: A Survey of 74 Hindustani Ragas. Zenith Media, London: 1999.

Basu, Pushpa. Raga- Rupanjali. Ratna Publications, Varanasi: 2007.

External links
 SRA on Samay and Ragas
 SRA on Ragas and Thaats
 More about Madhukali

Hindustani ragas